Bayad is a city in Aravalli district of Gujarat, India. It is the headquarters of a taluka of the same name. Prior to the formation of Aravalli district in 2013, Bayad was a part of Sabarkantha district.

See also 
 Aravalli district

References 

Cities and towns in Aravalli district